The 2018–19 Kansas State Wildcats men's basketball team represented Kansas State University in the 2018–19 NCAA Division I men's basketball season. Their head coach was Bruce Weber in his seventh year at the helm of the Wildcats. The team played its home games in Bramlage Coliseum in Manhattan, Kansas as members of the Big 12 Conference. They finished the season 25-9, to finish in first place. In the Big 12 tournament, they defeated TCU in the quarterfinals before losing to Iowa State in the semifinals. They received a at-large bid to the NCAA Tournament where they were upset by UC Irvine in the First Round.

Previous season
The Wildcats finished the 2017–18 season 25–12, 10–8 in Big 12 play to finish in fourth place. They defeated TCU in the quarterfinals of the Big 12 tournament before losing to Kansas in the semifinals. They received an at-large bid to the NCAA tournament as the No. 9 seed in the South region. There they defeated Creighton, UMBC, and Kentucky to advance to the Elite Eight. In the Elite Eight, they lost to Loyola–Chicago.

Offseason

Departures

Incoming transfers

2018 recruiting class

Roster

Schedule and results

|-
!colspan=12 style=|Exhibition

|-
!colspan=12 style="|Regular season

|-
!colspan=12 style=| Big 12 Tournament

|-
!colspan=12 style=""|

Rankings

*AP does not release post-NCAA tournament rankings^Coaches did not release a Week 2 poll.

References

Kansas State Wildcats men's basketball seasons
Kansas State
2018 in sports in Kansas
Kansas
Kansas State